William H. Payne (born March 12, 1949) is an American pianist who, with Lowell George, co-founded the American rock band Little Feat. He is considered by many other rock pianists, including Elton John, to be one of the finest American piano rock and blues musicians. In addition to his trademark barrelhouse blues piano, he is noted for his work on the Hammond B3 organ. Payne is an accomplished songwriter whose credits include "Oh, Atlanta". Following the death of Little Feat drummer Richie Hayward on August 12, 2010, Payne is the only member of the group from the original four-piece line-up currently playing in the band.

Payne has worked and recorded with J. J. Cale, Jimmy Buffett, Doobie Brothers, Emmylou Harris, Bryan Adams, Pink Floyd, Bob Seger, Toto, Linda Ronstadt, Jackson Browne, Carly Simon, James Taylor, Bonnie Raitt, Helen Watson, Stevie Nicks, Robert Palmer, Richard Torrance, Stephen Bruton, and Shocking Edison. He was a guest performer on Bonnie Raitt's album Sweet Forgiveness in 1977, and wrote its track, "Takin' My Time."

Paul Barrere and Bill Payne played several live concerts with Phil Lesh and Friends, from October 1999 through July 2000.  Payne was a member of Boulder band Leftover Salmon from 2014 until December 2015.

In August 2015, Payne was selected to play keyboards for The Doobie Brothers after their keyboardist Guy Allison was called to work on an album project in Japan. However, in December 2015 Payne rejoined the Doobies as a touring member, officially taking the position previously held by Allison.  In the few weeks of touring with the Doobies, he was featured with the band and Michael McDonald on The Tonight Show Starring Jimmy Fallon.  Payne's temporary term ended in early September after the Doobies' concert at the BB&T Pavilion in Camden, New Jersey.

Other work 
Payne was a pioneer in the development of online music communities. In the early 1990s, he contacted his fan base and enlisted the help of friend Jay Herbst to develop the Little Feat Grass-roots Movement. This model went on to be a template for many bands in the creation of their Street Teams, which enlist the help of fans for purposes of music and concert promotion. This method has proven to be an effective vehicle for bringing bands and fans closer together, and forging friendships between them.

Payne now also works as a commercial photographer.

Songwriting (selected)
Payne wrote or co-wrote many of the songs in Little Feat's catalogue, including the following:

"Snakes on Everything"
"Strawberry Flats"
"Truck-Stop Girl"
"Brides of Jesus"
"Tripe Face Boogie"
"Got No Shadow"
"Oh, Atlanta"
"Somebody's Leavin'"
"Time Loves a Hero"
"Gringo"
"Takin' My Time"
"Red Streamliner"
"All That You Dream"

Discography

Little Feat

Solo
 Cielo Norte (2005)

Collaborations 

With Bonnie Raitt 
 Takin' My Time (Warner Bros. Records, 1973)
 Home Plate (Warner Bros. Records, 1975)
 Sweet Forgiveness (Warner Bros. Records, 1977)
 The Glow (Warner Bros. Records, 1979)
 Nine Lives (Warner Bros. Records, 1986)

With Shigeru Suzuki
Band Wagon (Panam/Crown, 1975)

With Robert Palmer 
 Pressure Drop (Island Records, 1975)
 Some People Can Do What They Like (Island Records, 1976)
 Double Fun (Island Records, 1978)

With J. J. Cale
 Shades (Island Records, 1981)
 Closer to You (Virgin Records, 1994)

With Brian Cadd
 White on White (Capitol Records, 1976)

With Stephen Bishop
 Bish (ABC Records, 1978)

With Jimmy Barnes
 For the Working Class Man (Mushroom Records, 1985)

With Harry Nilsson
 Flash Harry (Mercury Records, 1980)

With Jackson Browne
 For Everyman (Asylum Records, 1973)
 The Pretender (Asylum Records, 1976)
 Hold Out (Asylum Records, 1980)
 Lawyers in Love (Asylum Records, 1983)
 Lives in the Balance (Asylum Records, 1986)

With Curtis Stigers
 Curtis Stigers (Arista Records, 1991)

With Steve Harley
 Hobo with a Grin (EMI, 1978)

With Emmylou Harris
 Elite Hotel (Reprise Records, 1975)
 Pieces of the Sky (Reprise Records, 1975)
 Blue Kentucky Girl (Warner Bros. Records, 1979)
 Evangeline (Warner Bros. Records, 1981)
 White Shoes (Warner Bros. Records, 1983)
 All I Intended to Be (Nonesuch Records, 2008)

With Janis Ian
 Restless Eyes (Columbia Records, 1981)

With James Reyne
 James Reyne (Capitol Records, 1987)
 The Whiff of Bedlam (RooArt, 1994)

With Rod Stewart
 Out of Order (Warner Bros. Records, 1988)

With Gail Davies
 Givin' Herself Away (Warner Bros. Records, 1982)
 What Can I Say (Warner Bros. Records, 1983)
 Where Is a Woman to Go (RCA Records, 1984)

With Steve Cropper
 Playin' My Thang (MCA Records, 1981)

With Jeffrey Osborne
 Emotional (A&M Records, 1986)

With Michael Martin Murphey
 Lone Wolf (Epic Records, 1978)

With Dolly Parton, Emmylou Harris and Linda Ronstadt
 Trio (Warner Bros, Records, 1987)

With Gregg Allman Band
 Playin' Up a Storm (Capricorn Records, 1977)

With Jude Cole
 Start the Car (Reprise Records, 1992)

With Diana DeGarmo
 Blue Skies (RCA Records, 2004)

With Bob Seger
 Against the Wind (Capitol Records, 1980)
 The Distance (Capitol Records, 1982)
 Like a Rock (Capitol Records, 1986)
 The Fire Inside (Capitol Records, 1991)
 It's a Mystery (Capitol Records, 1995)
 Face the Promise (Capitol Records, 2006)
 I Knew You When (Capitol Records, 2017)

With Colin James
 Colin James (Virgin Records, 1988)

With Melanie
 Seventh Wave (Neighbourhood Records, 1983)

With B.B. King
 Deuces Wild (MCA Records, 1997)

With Bryan Adams
 Waking Up the Neighbours (A&M Records, 1991)

With Stevie Nicks
 Bella Donna (Atco Records, 1981)
 Rock a Little (Modern Records, 1985)

With Cher
 Cher (Geffen, 1987)

With Shannon McNally
 Jukebox Sparrows (Capitol Records, 2002)

With Jimmy Buffett
 License to Chill (RCA Records, 2004)
 Take the Weather with You (RCA Records, 2006)

With Shawn Colvin
 Fat City (Columbia Records, 1992)

With Carly Simon
 No Secrets (Elektra Records, 1972)
 Another Passenger (Elektra Records, 1976)
 Spoiled Girl (Epic Records, 1985)
 Coming Around Again (Arista Records, 1987)

With Richard Marx
 Repeat Offender (Capitol Records, 1989)
 Paid Vacation (Capitol Records, 1994)

With Neil Diamond
 Up on the Roof: Songs from the Brill Building (Columbia Records, 1993)
 The Christmas Album, Volume II (Columbia Records, 1994)

With Emmylou Harris and Rodney Crowell
 Old Yellow Moon (Nonesuch Records, 2013)

With Art Garfunkel
 Watermark (Columbia Records, 1977)

With Julia Fordham
 Falling Forward (Virgin Records, 1994)

With Gene Parsons
 Kindling (Warner Bros. Records, 1973)

With Barbra Streisand
 Wet (Columbia Records, 1979)

With Maria Muldaur
 Sweet Harmony (Reprise Records, 1976)
 Meet Me at Midnite (Black Top Records, 1994)

With Shelby Lynne
 Love, Shelby (Island Records, 2001)
 Identity Crisis (Capitol Records, 2003)

With Jane Wiedlin
 Jane Wiedlin (IRS Records, 1985)

With Dusty Springfield
 It Begins Again (Mercury Records, 1978)

With Donovan
 Lady of the Stars (RCA Records, 1984)

With Jennifer Warnes
 Famous Blue Raincoat (Cypress Records, 1986)

With Melissa Manchester
 Don't Cry Out Loud (Arista Records, 1978)

With Phoebe Snow
 Rock Away (Mirage, 1981)

With James Taylor
 That's Why I'm Here (Columbia Records, 1985)
 Never Die Young (Columbia Records, 1988)

With Dolly Parton
 Great Balls of Fire (RCA Records, 1979)
 Dolly, Dolly, Dolly (RCA Victor, 1981)

With Leo Sayer
 Endless Flight (Chrysalis Records, 1976)
 Here (Chrysalis Records, 1979)

With Valerie Carter
 Just a Stone's Throw Away (Columbia Records, 1977)

With Yvonne Elliman
 Night Flight (RSO Records, 1978)

With Linda Ronstadt
 Mad Love (Asylum Records, 1980)
 Get Closer (Asylum Records, 1982)

With Rita Coolidge
 Heartbreak Radio (A&M Records, 1981)
 Inside the Fire (A&M Records, 1984)

With Nicolette Larson
 Nicolette (Warner Bros. Records, 1978)
 In the Nick of Time (Warner Bros. Records, 1979)
 Radioland (Warner Bros. Records, 1981)
 All Dressed Up and No Place to Go (Warner Bros. Records, 1981)

With Taj Mahal
 Dancing the Blues (Private Music, 1993)

With Doobie Brothers
 Toulouse Street (Warner Brothers, 1972)
 The Captain and Me (Warner Brothers, 1973
 What Were Once Vices Are Now Habits (Warner Brothers, 1974)
 Stampede (Warner Brothers, 1975)
 Minute by Minute (Warner Brothers, 1978)
 Cycles (Capital Records, 1989)
 World Gone Crazy (HOR Records, 2010)
 Live at the Beacon Theatre (Rhino Records, 2019)
 Liberté (Island Records, 2021)

With Tom Johnston
 Everything You've Heard Is True (Warner Brothers, 1979)

With Patrick Simmons
Arcade (Elektra, 1983)

References

External links
 Bill Payne Discography
 Little Feat website
 Something Wild (1966)
 Certain Fury O.S.T. (1985)
 Shocking Edison Website

1949 births
Living people
People from Waco, Texas
American session musicians
Singer-songwriters from Texas
Little Feat members
American rock keyboardists
American male singer-songwriters
American rock songwriters
American rock singers
American organists
American male organists
American rock pianists
American male pianists
American jazz keyboardists
American jazz pianists
American funk keyboardists
20th-century American pianists
20th-century American male singers
20th-century American singers
21st-century American keyboardists
21st-century American pianists
21st-century American male musicians
21st-century organists
American male jazz musicians
Leftover Salmon members
20th-century American keyboardists